Thamsbrück (in German also Ablassstadt Thamsbrück ["Indulgence town Thamsbrück"]) is a quarter of the town of Bad Langensalza in Thuringia, central Germany, about  northwest of Erfurt, with 940 inhabitants. The town, which has been independent since 1206, was incorporated into Bad Langensalza in 1994.

Thamsbrück is the oldest small town in Thuringia and, with the Indulgence Festival (Ablassfest), has a tradition of more than 500 years.

Geography 
The surrounding area is agricultural. On the southern and western edge of the village, the Unstrut, with two river courses, flows eastwards to the Saale. The Welsbach, which comes from the north, flows into the Unstrut on the north-west side of the village.

History 
Thamsbrück was first mentioned in a document in 736. It describes that the church in Thamsbrück was founded by the Anglo-Saxon missionary Boniface. In 1149, Louis the Iron had a castle built on the hill in front of the Unstrut river for his brother Louis the Younger. In 1206, Thamsbrück was documented in a deed of donation by Landgrave Hermann I and named civitas (Latin for "town") when a Mühlhausen arbitration award was confirmed. This is generally regarded as the first mention of the town charter. Until 1490, Thamsbrück Castle formed the centre of a landgravial office, then it was absorbed into the Langensalza office. On 20 June 1500, 30 Thamsbrückers returned from a campaign against rebellious Frisians who had risen up against the Gubernator of Friesland, the Wettin Henry the Pious.

Until 1815, Thamsbrück belonged to the Electorate of Langensalza, and after it was ceded to Prussia, from 1816 to 1944 it belonged to the district of Langensalza in the province of Saxony. In 1868, Thamsbrück Castle was demolished and the area, including the moat, was turned into a garden. The castle tower, however, was spared. Anno 1890 saw the founding of the "Schloss Thamsbrück" malt factory.

A town portrait published in 1975 mentions the agricultural production cooperative (LPG) "Karl Marx", which was united with a part of the farm in Großwelsbach, as the main agricultural enterprise, as well as the two malt factories located in the town, the VEB "Feuerteufel" (Firebug) and the only mill construction company remaining in the GDR, "ORANO", which also took over the production of millstones.

One of four Dingstühle of the Thuringian district court at Mittelhausen was located in Thamsbrück.

Sights 

 
 Town hall
 St Nicholas's Tower

Notable people 
 Ulrich Fleischhauer (1876–1960), anti-Semitic publicist and publisher
 Hermann Ludwig Blankenburg (1876–1956), composer, called "March King", honorary citizen of the town

References

External links 

Bad Langensalza
Former municipalities in Thuringia